Engen is a surname of Scandinavian origin which may refer to:

Alexandra Engen (born 1988), Swedish cross country cyclist
Alf Engen (1909–1997), Norwegian-American skier and skiing school owner/teacher 
Asbjørn Engen  (1917/1918–1985), Norwegian newspaper editor and organizational leader 
Bjarte Engen Vik, former Norwegian Nordic combined athlete
Chris Engen (actor), American actor 
Corey Engen (1916–2006), captain of the U.S. Nordic ski team at the 1948 Winter Olympics
Donald D. Engen (1924–1999), United States Navy vice admiral
Hans Engen (1912–1966), Norwegian journalist, diplomat and politician for the Labour Party
Ingrid Syrstad Engen (born 1998), Norwegian footballer
John Engen (1964–2022), American politician, mayor of Missoula, Montana
Jon Engen (1957–2018), American skier
Kieth Engen (1925–2004), American operatic bass and pop singer
Rolf Engen (1929–2018), American businessman
Ståle Engen (born 1947), Norwegian long-distance runner
Svein Engen (born 1953), Norwegian biathlete
Sverre Engen (1911–2001), Norwegian-American skier, ski coach, ski area manager and film-maker
Whitney Engen (born 1987), American soccer player

Surnames
Norwegian-language surnames